Liptovský Trnovec is a village and municipality in Liptovský Mikuláš District in the Žilina Region of northern Slovakia.

History 
In historical records the village was first mentioned in 1283.

Geography 
The municipality lies at an altitude of 570 metres and covers an area of 27.451 km². It has a population of about 550 people.

External links 
 https://web.archive.org/web/20071217080336/http://www.statistics.sk/mosmis/eng/run.html

Villages and municipalities in Liptovský Mikuláš District